The Serbian Coordination Directorate (in Serbian Координациона управа / Koordinaciona uprava) is an authority which is responsible for issuing Serbian passports to Serbian citizens residing in Kosovo.

In the process of granting visa-free travel to the Schengen Area, the European Union urged Serbia to found such a special authority for its citizens residing in Kosovo as the European Union considered it impossible for Serbia to evaluate the issuing of original source documents needed to apply for a passport and the integrity of the procedures applied by Serbia to check the authenticity of documents provided by applicants for that purpose. In July 2009, Serbia founded the Serbian Coordination Directorate.

Serbian passports issued by the Serbian Coordination Directorate do not allow the holder to enter the Schengen Area without a visa, even for a stay of less than three months within half a year; nor do Kosovan passports. Serbian citizens with passports issued by other authorities enjoy such a privilege.

References

Government of Serbia
Foreign relations of Serbia
Kosovo–Serbia relations
Kosovo Serbs